Kenmont Primary School (KPS) is a 3–11 mixed community primary school in Kensal Green, London, England. It was designed in 1883–84 by the architect Edward Robert Robson for the School Board for London and completed after 1894. It has been Grade II listed since 1984 and has been described as a "particularly impressive and well-preserved example of a Robson board school, remarkable for its unusual plan and dramatic, fortress-like composition".

References

External links 
 

Kensal Green
Community schools in the London Borough of Hammersmith and Fulham
Primary schools in the London Borough of Hammersmith and Fulham
Grade II listed buildings in the London Borough of Hammersmith and Fulham
Grade II listed educational buildings